Batocera victoriana is a species of beetle in the family Cerambycidae. It was described by Thomson in 1856. It is known from Borneo, India, Laos, the Philippines, Malaysia, Vietnam, and Sumatra. It contains the varietas Batocera victoriana var. velleda.

References

Batocerini
Beetles described in 1856